Tietong Township is a township in Zongyang County, Anhui, China. It is an island between the Yangtze River and Jia River.

History
On July 16, 2020, all the remaining 2,272 people were evacuated except 176 left behind due to the flood inundated the island.

Administrative division
As of 2017, the township is divided into four villages: 
 Qingfeng
 Xinfeng
 Jiangtou
 Zhongnan

Economy
The local economy is primarily based upon agriculture. The main vegetables are lotus bean, green bean, carrot, mustard, and cabbage.

Transport
Ferry is the main mode of transportation.

References

Divisions of Zongyang County